Mastododera is a genus of beetles in the family Cerambycidae, containing the following species:

 Mastododera fallaciosa Villiers, 1982
 Mastododera jansoni Waterhouse, 1882
 Mastododera lateralis (Guérin-Méneville, 1844)
 Mastododera monticola Villiers, 1982
 Mastododera nodicollis (Klug, 1833)
 Mastododera rufosericans Fairmaire, 1893
 Mastododera tibialis Fairmaire, 1894
 Mastododera transversalis Fairmaire, 1889
 Mastododera velutina Villiers, 1982
 Mastododera vicina Villiers, 1982
 Mastododera villiersi Vives, 2001

References

External links

Dorcasominae